Richard Winn (1750December 19, 1818) was an American politician, surveyor, merchant, and slave owner from Winnsboro, South Carolina. During the American Revolutionary War he was an officer in the 3rd South Carolina Regiment. After the regiment was captured at Charleston, he served in a militia partisan unit under Thomas Sumter. After the war he became a general in the South Carolina militia.

He represented South Carolina in the U.S. House from 1793 until 1797 and from 1803 to 1813.

References

External links
 204 North Zion Street - Wynn Dee Plantation in Winnsboro, S.C.

Members of the South Carolina House of Representatives
South Carolina militiamen in the American Revolution
Continental Army officers from South Carolina
American militia generals
1750 births
1818 deaths
Democratic-Republican Party members of the United States House of Representatives from South Carolina